A crêpe or crepe ( or , ,) is a very thin type of pancake. Crêpes are usually one of two varieties: sweet crêpes or savoury galettes. They are often served with a wide variety of fillings such as cheese, fruit, vegetables, meats, and a variety of spreads. Crêpes can also be flambéed, such as in crêpes Suzette.

Etymology

Traditions
In France, crêpes are traditionally served on the Christian holiday Candlemas, on February 2. In 472, Roman Pope Gelasius I offered  (later said Crêpes) to French pilgrims that were visiting Rome for the Chandeleur. They brought the dish back to France, and the day also became known as "Le Jour des Crêpes" ("The Day of the Crêpes"). The day is also celebrated by many as the day that marks the transition from winter to spring (similar to the North American tradition of Groundhog Day), with the golden color and circular shape of crêpes representing the sun and the circle of life.

There are a few superstitions around the preparation of crêpes for Le Jour des Crêpes. 

One example involves holding a gold coin (such as a Louis d'or) or ring in the left hand while successfully flipping a crêpe in a pan with the right hand. It's said to bring a person wealth in the upcoming year (other variations describe a year of good weather). 

Another version of the tradition involves cooking a crêpe with a gold coin on top. Some hide the first crêpe in a drawer instead of eating it for good luck in the coming year. Eating and sharing crêpes with others on Candlemas is another tradition based on popes giving food to the poor every year on February 2.

A traditional French proverb describes the tradition of eating crêpes on Candlemas: “manger des crêpes à la chandeleur apporte un an de bonheur” (eating crêpes on Candlemas brings a year of happiness).

Types 
Sweet crêpes are generally made with wheat flour. When sweet, they can be eaten as part of breakfast or as a dessert. Common fillings include hazelnut cocoa spread, preserves, sugar (granulated or powdered), maple syrup, golden syrup, lemon juice, whipped cream, fruit spreads, custard, and sliced soft fruits or confiture.

Savory crêpes are made with non-wheat flours such as buckwheat. A normal savory crêpe recipe includes using wheat flour but omitting the sugar. Batter made from buckwheat flour is gluten-free, which makes it possible for people who have a wheat allergy or gluten intolerance to eat this type of crêpe. Common savory fillings for crêpes are cheese, ham, and eggs, ratatouille, mushrooms, artichoke (in certain regions), and various meat products.

Crêpes can also be made into crepe cakes by stacking plain crepes on top of each other, adding a layer of filling between the layers. Fruits, chocolate, cookies, marshmallow, etc., can be added. Most crêpe cakes are sweet and considered dessert. It can also replace the traditional birthday cake. Crêpe cakes are usually 15-30 layers, and the crêpes used are very thin and soft.

Batters can also consist of other ingredients such as butter, milk, water, eggs, flour, salt, and sugar. Fillings are commonly added to the center of the crêpe and served with the edges partially folded over the center.
An Indian variety of the crêpe uses a multi-grain flour called "bhajanee," eggs, curd, and an assortment of spices as its ingredients. It is a modern variation of an Indian dish called Thalipeeth.

A cake made with layers of crêpes with a filling in between is called “gâteau de crêpes” or “ミルクレープ(mille-crêpes)” (a Japanese-made French word combining crêpes and mille-feuille). This French pâtisserie, was popularized by Emy Wada, a pâtissier who studied in France and operated Paper Moon Cake Boutiques in Japan, in the 1980s. In 2001, she expanded to New York City, where she supplied crêpe cakes to popular chains Dean & DeLuca and Takashimaya through the company Lady M.

Recipe
The standard recipe for French crêpe calls for flour, eggs, milk, salt, and butter. Sugar is optional. In the industrial production of crêpes, the dry ingredients are combined with eggs to form a dough. The rest of the wet ingredients are then added to thin the batter to a loose enough consistency to spread easily. The batter is added, one ladle at a time, to a hot, greased pan, cooked until golden, then flipped. Crêpe batter is characterized by its liquidity, making it easy to spread in a thin layer. Crêpes are also characterized by their quick cooking time, usually 20–30 seconds per side.

In older versions of crêpe recipes, beer or wine was used instead of milk. Buckwheat flour is often used as well, specifically in making a Breton Galette.

Crêperies
A crêperie may be a takeaway restaurant or stall, serving crêpes as a form of fast food or street food, or it may be a more formal sit-down restaurant or café. Crêperies can be found throughout France, especially in Brittany and in many other countries. Many also serve apple cider, a popular drink to accompany crêpes.

Special crêpes

Mille crêpes(ja) are a French cake made of many crêpe layers. The word mille means "a thousand," implying the many layers of crêpe. Another standard French and Belgian crêpe is the crêpe Suzette, a crêpe with lightly grated orange peel and liqueur (usually Grand Marnier), which is lit during presentation.

The 49er flapjack is a sourdough crêpe which is popular in the United States, getting its name from the popularity of this style of pancake during the California Gold Rush. Because it is similar to a Swedish pancake, the 49er is sometimes served with lingonberry sauce, although most often, it is rolled up with butter and powdered sugar or served open-faced and topped with maple syrup.

Crêpe dentelle is a crispy biscuit made with a very thin layer of crêpe folded in a cigar shape and then baked. It is usually enjoyed with a hot drink during the goûter, in France.

Crêpes in European culture
In Norwegian, crêpes are called pannekake, and in most German regions Crêpes (referring to a wide and flat crêpe, as opposed to the smaller and thicker native Pfannkuchen pancakes). In Swedish, a crêpe is called pannkaka in southern regions while being called plättar in the north. In Danish it is called pandekager ("pancakes"). In Icelandic it is called pönnukaka. In Finnish a crêpe is called either ohukainen or lettu or räiskäle. In Greek it is called krepa (Κρέπα). In Dutch it is a pannenkoek or flensje. In Afrikaans crêpes are called pannekoek, and are usually served with cinnamon and sugar. In the Spanish regions of Galicia and Asturias, they are traditionally served at carnivals. In Galicia, they're called filloas and may also be made with pork blood instead of milk. In Asturias, they are called fayueles or frixuelos, and in Turkey, akıtma.

In the Balkan countries, palačinka or pallaçinka may be eaten with fruit jam, quark cheese, sugar, honey, or the hazelnut-chocolate cream Nutella, while there is also a breaded variant which is mostly filled with meat. Restaurants specializing in palačinci are called "Palačinkara" in the region. In Ashkenazi Jewish cuisine, there is a similar dish known as the blintz. The Oxford English Dictionary derives the German and Slavic words from the Hungarians palacsinta, which it derives from the Romanian plăcintă, which comes in turn from classical Latin placenta ("small flat cake"), even though the Romanian plăcintă is more similar to a pie, and the crêpes are called clătită.

During the East Slavic celebration of Maslenitsa (Cheesefare Week), one of the most popular foods are blini, or crêpes. Since they are made from butter, eggs, and milk, crêpes can be consumed during the celebration by the Orthodox church.  White flour can be replaced with buckwheat flour, milk can be switched for kefir, and oils can be added or substituted.  Blini are served with butter and topped with caviar, cheese, meat, potatoes, mushrooms, honey, berry jam, or often a dollop of sour cream. The dish is supposed to represent the sun since the holiday is about the beginning of spring.

Crêpes outside of Europe
Crêpes have also long been popular in Japan and Malaysia, with sweet and savory varieties being sold at many small stands, usually called crêperies. In Argentina and Uruguay, they are called panqueques and are often eaten with dulce de leche. Various other French foods such as crêpes, soufflés, and quiche have slowly made their way into American cooking establishments. Typically, these franchises stick to the traditional French method of making crêpes, but they have also put their own spin on the crêpe with new types, such as the hamburger and pizza crêpe. In Canada, particularly in French-speaking regions, crêpes and galettes have long been traditional food items. 

The Japanese crêpes developed into something different from the French crêpes due to their various fillings and toppings, and the style later spread outside of Japan. It is often called 'Harajuku Crêpes'. In Japan, French crêpes were introduced in the 1970s, and they were only spread with jam and were not very popular. In 1977, Mizuki Ono opened a crêpe shop in Harajuku and, taking inspiration from ice cream monaka, began to sell crêpes with ice cream, whipped cream, and sliced fruit, which became very popular. They were rarely made at home and spread as sweets purchased from street stalls and eaten on the street.

In Mexico, crêpes are known as crepas and were introduced during the 19th century by the French and are typically served either as a sweet dessert when filled with cajeta (similar to dulce de leche), or as a savoury dish when filled with Huitlacoche (corn smut), which is considered a delicacy.

Similar dishes in other cuisines
In South India, a similar dish made of fermented rice batter is called a dosa, which often has savory fillings. In Western India, a dish made of gram flour is called "Pudlaa" or "Poodla," with the batter consisting of vegetables and spices. Another variety is called "patibola" and is sweet in taste due to milk, jaggery, or sugar. The injera of Ethiopian/Eritrean/Somali/Yemeni cuisine is often described as a thick crêpe. In Somalia, malawah is very similar to a crêpe. It is mostly eaten at breakfast.

In the Philippines, a  native crêpe recipe is the daral which is made from ground glutinous rice and coconut milk batter (galapong). It is rolled into a cylinder and filled with sweetened coconut meat strips (hinti).

In Indonesia, Kue leker is a type of Indonesian crêpe. Also, ledre, a rolled banana crêpe from Bojonegoro.

In China, Jianbing is a traditional Chinese street food similar to crêpes. It is generally eaten for breakfast and hailed as "one of China's most popular street breakfasts."  It consists of wheat and grain-based crepe, an egg, deep-fried crackers (known as Bao Cui/薄脆 in Chinese), 2-3 savory/spicy sauces, and chopped scallions & coriander.

See also

References

Sources
 19. Life A La Henri – Being The Memories of Henri Charpentier, by Henri Charpentier and Boyden Sparkes, The Modern Library, New York, 2001 Paperback Edition.  Originally published in 1934 by Simon & Schuster, Inc.

External links
 
 
 
 How to make a crepe

Pancakes
Belgian cuisine
Breton cuisine
Desserts
European cuisine
French desserts
Snack foods
Street food
Articles containing video clips
National dishes